Independent Methodist may refer to:
 Fellowship of Independent Methodist Churches, based in the United Kingdom
 Independent Methodist Connexion, based in the United Kingdom
 Association of Independent Methodists, based in the United States